Forças Populares 25 de Abril (FP 25 de Abril or FP-25) was a far-left terrorist group led by Otelo Saraiva de Carvalho, operating in Portugal between 1980 and 1987. Most of its members had previously been active in the Brigadas Revolucionárias, an armed group with links to the Revolutionary Party of the Proletariat (Partido Revolucionário do Proletariado). A total of 20 people were killed by the FP-25, most of them innocent people, as a result of direct shooting attacks, bombings and confrontations with the police during bank robberies or escape attempts.

Ideology

The FP-25 brought together the most radical sectors of the Portuguese radical left, who were growing discontent with the development of bourgeois democracy and capitalism in post-Carnation Revolution Portugal. In the organization's "Manifesto ao Povo Trabalhador" or "Manifesto to the Workers" released in April 1980, the organization outlined its opposition to amendments to the Portuguese Constitution of 1976, specifically the abandonment of socialism, the abandonment of agrarian land reforms or the perceived lack of expression of the will of the people.

Opposing the political realities of the time, the FP-25 proposed a model of popular democracy, based on popular assemblies - the so-called basismo ("basism") ou conselhismo ("councelism"), similar to the Libyan or Cuban revolutions. It also defended the non-alignment with either side of the Cold War as a necessary condition to the implementation of socialism in Portugal.

The nature of the armed actions and terrorist attacks showed a preoccupation with different causes: political, economic, solidarity with other terrorist groups and support of FP-25 militants that had been arrested. The group unsuccessfully tried to intimidate the population, provoke a general revolt and raise a popular army.

History

Founded in 1980, in the midst of a period of democratic consolidation that followed the turbulent years after 25 April 1974, the Forças Populares 25 de Abril brought together the most radical sectors of the revolutionary left, which were opposed to the establishment of a party base, parliamentary representative system, the restoration of the capitalist economic and social system. The document shared at the organization initial announcement "Manifesto ao Povo Trabalhador“, mentioned serious deviations from the 1976 Constitution, namely the abandonment of socialism, the abandonment of the land ownership nationalization (“Reforma Agrária”) and the loss of the people's decision-making process.

In the financial sphere, the main source of financing were bank robberies, as well as companies and vehicles for transporting valuables, which they called "expropriation" or "recoveries of funds". Gradually there was political and media isolation, the FP-25 quickly created, among public opinion, the image of an organization committed to the practice of common delinquency trying to intimidate the population and conditioning political decisions, seeking to provoke an insurrection with the support of a militia or a people's army.

The Forças Populares 25 de Abril soon took on the selective killings and the use of extreme violence in their actions. The first deaths officially claimed by the organization took place in May 1980 and mainly resulted from confrontations with elements of the security forces, during bank robberies or during police rides.

In October of the same year, following a failed robbery of two bank branches, near Lisbon with gunfire where two terrorists and an innocent civilian were killed. It was only in late 1982 that the first among many intentional murders took place — businessman Diamantino Monteiro Pereira.

On January 27, 1985 6 NATO ships including the USS Richard E. Byrd were attacked. The group carried out another attack in February 1985 which involved detonating eight incendiary bombs under cars belonging to West Germany Air Force personnel assigned to a Portuguese airbase outside Beja. The explosions injured one person and caused considerable damage.

Later in 1986, the most well-known assassination of the Prison Services ‘General Manager, Gaspar Castelo-Branco — the only high-ranking official in the State hierarchy to be killed. This was an action that was directly related to the conditions of detention of the defendants. They claimed the right to be considered political prisoners, with free movement in the prison, the possibility of meeting with external elements and direct access to the media. This condition was not granted to them, being treated as prisoners of common crime. However, some months later, following an escape by a group of ten defendants from the Lisbon Penitentiary, in September 1985, conditions were worsened, with limited circulation, an obligation to stay in cells and restrictions on communication abroad. The responsibility for this directive was attributed to Gaspar Castelo Branco and because of it he was murdered.

Until the organization's dissolution, the victims of the FP-25's "executions" are mostly small businessmen and administrators — typically associated with companies in difficult economic situation, sometimes also with serious labor disputes or collective dismissal processes. An exception was the revenge carried out on a businessman, Alexandre Souto, which took place inside of the Lisbon International Fair — death explained as retaliation for the death of the terrorist arrested in a robbery at Souto own's commercial establishment. Another victim, José Manuel Barradas, was an organization's dissident, murdered for his collaboration with the authorities.  Nevertheless, the most shocking murder was the death of a 4 months baby, in a bomb attack that targeted his grandfather. The terrorists wrongly had classified him as a large landowner, but he was only a modest tenant.

Despite the fact that evidence of planning kidnapping actions has been found, the FP-25 never carried out kidnappings or extortion actions against businessmen or other economic agents, due to the anticipation of Operation Orion – one of the largest police operations at the time which resulted in the arrest of most of its founders, directives and operational.

In terms of financing actions, the theft, in 1984, of 108,000,000 escudos (approximately €500,000, a clearly large amount at the time) of a van transporting valuable from the Bank of Portugal, right in the center of Lisbon. Nevertheless, several assaults happen, usually at the end of the month, in order to allow to collect money from salaries.

The majority of the terrorist was arrested in June 1984 and the trial started at the end of July 1986. Most of the defended were found guilty on being members of a terrorist group and sentenced to prison terms approaching the maximum penalty. With them Otelo Saraiva de Carvalho , one of the leader of the April revolution, was sentenced to 15 years, later raised to 17 by Supreme Court. Nevertheless, he only spent 59 months in prison. President, Mario Soares had tried to preserve the historic memory of Otelo Saraiva de Carvalho as a Carnation Revolution hero and tried to pursue a political solution instead a letting flow judicial and criminal processes. As so, he pushed parliament whose left wing majority was supported by the socialist PS and the communist party PCP, to approve an amnesty. However, this was only applied for terrorism crimes. The assassinations went on trial, in 2001. By that time it was very difficult to identify who were the authors of the crimes, and the defendant were exonerated.

Foreign links and funding 
Although the FP-25 tried to obtain the support of foreign governments for funding and logistical support, it seems that the majority of the group's financing came from the above-mentioned "recovery of funds". Still, some governments (especially Mozambique) did grant some support, for instance giving sanctuary to militants escaping the Portuguese authorities.

The FP-25 also tried to collaborate with other terrorist groups, namely the IRA and the ETA, the latter confirming that there was an exchange of weapons and technical know-how. In 1981, FP-25 received from ETA, Gama 2 explosives and two dozen FireBird pistols in exchange for G3 machine guns. Additionally, ETA came to harbor in the Basque Country, two FP-25 terrorists who needed to retreat.

Although the focus on local targets, the terrorist group also attack both foreign companies, embassies or consulates.

Dismantling and Orion Operation 
On June 19, as part of the largest police operation ever occur in Portugal, with the code name Orion, more than 64 terrorists were arrested and, a day later, their main leaders, including Otelo Saraiva de Carvalho. The operation, which involved more than 300 police officers, lead to the arrest of both members form the terrorist organization – FP-25, as well as the leaders and militants of the political party – Força de Unidade Popular - that was giving legal cover to the organization. In addition to an ideological convergence, it was noticed a coincidence of militants and coordination between legal and clandestine entities. This joint structure was called the Global Project.

In the following years, most of the militants who were still on the run, were either arrested or sought refuge abroad — namely in Mozambique — a fact that would dictate the progressive dissolution of the organization until its complete disappearance around 1991.

Terrorist Association Trial 
More than two years after the aforementioned Operation Orion, in October 1986, the trial begun. They were on trial for the crimes of terrorist association and attack against democracy. The blood crimes and murderess were later judged separately.

From the trial, the court found the following:

“That the Global Project/FP25, founded and directed by Otelo Saraiva de Carvalho, Pedro Goulart, Mouta Liz and others, is an armed terrorist organization…”

•“That this terrorist organization aimed at the destruction, by weapons, of the Portuguese democratic regime, constituting in Portugal an urban terrorism organization, typical of demo-liberal democracies, corresponding, in its scale, to the Italian Red Brigades and partially to the German RAF… ”

•“The governing body of the Global Project/FP25 is the DPM – Political-Military Directorate – which includes the defendants Otelo Saraiva de Carvalho, Pedro Goulart, Humberto Dinis Machado, José Mouta Liz…….. “.

The sentence ended up condemning Otelo Saraiva de Carvalho to 15 years in prison. Several documents seized at the home of Otelo Saraiva de Carvalho contributed greatly to the conviction, namely his two notebooks, manuscripts, as well as all the documentation found at the FUP's headquarters.

After passing through the Court of Appeal and the Supreme Court of Justice, Otelo Saraiva de Carvalho's sentence was set at 17 years. The court process would be marked by slowness and controversy, namely with the immensity of procedural incidents whose objective was to delay the successful conclusion of the trial. But mainly because of the winding way in which it took place, ending up in a political resolution through an amnesty later approved by the Parliament by request of the President Mário Soares.

Amnesty 
During Otelo's arrest, trial and specially after his conviction, the involvement of President Mário Soares was increasing. Several socialists’, members of parliament, were visiting the convicts in jail, meeting with their families or even with Otelo supporters activists groups.

Abroad, François Mitterrand questioned Mário Soares about Otelo, naming him as “Portuguese Sakharov”. President Mário Soares wanted to preserve Otelo as a symbol of Carnation Revolution and felt legitimated to politically resolve an issue that was related to justice.

Meanwhile, on 10 May 1991, some terrorist made a symbolic handover of some weapons, together with a document in which they renounced armed violence and assumed the end of the terrorist group.

In October 1995 legislative elections, the right lost its majority: PSD and CDS together amounted to no more than 103 deputies and the left, PS (socialists) and PCP (communists), now had a majority capable of getting the law passed. At 3 March 1996, the parliament, after a long and very heated discussion, approved a global amnesty to FP25 convicts for crimes of terrorist and attack to democracy. It was approved by 123 votes in favor from PS and PCP and some PSD deputies, 94 votes from the PSD and CDS and 3 abstentions from independent deputies.

Epilogue 
After the amnesty and the statute of limitations for blood crimes prescribed, most of the Global Project members remained anonymous, despite some exceptions

Otelo Saraiva de Carvalho, the most visible face of the organization, was a regular presence in the national media landscape. In addition, his appearance in an erotic clip and the fact that he assumed his bigamy made him an even more famous figure. He lived with the woman he originally married between Thursday and Sunday and with another, a prison guard he met in Caxias prison, from Monday through Thursday.

Some of the accused maintained an active political presence in the Bloco de Esquerda, a far-left trotskyst populist party with parliamentary representation, forming part of its political directory and running for municipal roles, for mayors or parish councils. A few others joined the Socialist Party, reaching, in some cases, prominent positions at the county level. The repentant ones settled in Mozambique and Brazil. Some came back a few years later. Very few acknowledged having belonged to the FP-25 and, didn't return to armed violence. However, none showed any sign of regret or apologized privately to the victims or publicly the country for the crimes they committed. None paid the compensation to the victims defined by the court, either.

At the same time, the victims lived ignored and almost in silence. The exception was in 2016, with the condecoration of Gaspar Castelo Branco, by President of Republic, with the Grand Cross of the Order of Infante D. Henrique, more than 30 years after his assassination. However, only in 2021, 25 years after the amnesty, several articles and a book were published and latter reinforced with the discussion held after Otelo's regarding his role and responsibility leading the terrorist group. Nevertheless the topic reappeared on the Portuguese political agenda, almost as if it was a novelty.

References

Communism in Portugal
Communist terrorism
Defunct communist militant groups
Maoist organizations in Europe
Paramilitary organisations based in Portugal
Terrorism in Portugal
1980 establishments in Portugal
1987 disestablishments in Portugal